Alexander, son of Perseus of Macedon, was a child at the conquest of his father by the Romans, and after the triumph of Aemilus Paullus in  167 BC, was kept in custody at Alba Fucens, together with his father. He became skilful in the toreutic art, learned the Latin language, and became a public notary.

References
 Liv. xlv. 42 ; Pint. Aem. Paul. 37.

Ancient Macedonian artists
Third Macedonian War
2nd-century BC Macedonians
Roman-era Macedonians
Ancient Greeks in Rome
Civil law notaries